In the 1897 Iowa State Senate elections Iowa voters elected state senators to serve in the twenty-seventh Iowa General Assembly. Elections were held in 21 of the state senate's 50 districts. State senators serve four-year terms in the Iowa State Senate.

A statewide map of the 50 state Senate districts in the 1897 elections is provided by the Iowa General Assembly here.

The 1897 elections occurred before primary elections were established in Iowa by the Primary Election Law in 1907. The general election took place on November 2, 1897.

Following the previous election, Republicans had control of the Iowa Senate with 43 seats to Democrats' 7 seats.

To claim control of the chamber from Republicans, the Democrats needed to net 19 Senate seats.

Republicans maintained control of the Iowa State Senate following the 1897 general election with the balance of power shifting to Republicans holding 39 seats and Democrats having 11 seats (a net gain of 4 seats for Democrats).

Summary of Results
Note: The holdover Senators not up for re-election are not listed on this table.

Source:

Detailed Results
NOTE: The Iowa Official Register does not contain detailed vote totals for state senate elections in 1897.

See also
 Elections in Iowa

References

Iowa Senate
Iowa
Iowa Senate elections